The National Action Party (Partido Acción Nacional - PAN) is a right-wing Nicaraguan political party founded by Eduardo Rivas Gasteazoro in 1985 as a split from the Social Christian Party (PSC) in 1985. The PAN received legal status on appeal in 1989. PAN was part of the National Opposition Union (UNO) coalition and won 3 seats (out of UNO's 51) in the National Assembly in 1990.

References
Harry E. Vanden, Gary Prevost. "Parties in the 1990 Election." Democracy and Socialism in Sandinista Nicaragua. Lynne Rienner Publishers, Feb 1, 1996  pg. 134

Catholic political parties
Christian democratic parties in North America
Political parties established in 1985
Political parties in Nicaragua
1985 establishments in Nicaragua